Fritz Mensing (April 25, 1895 – November 2, 1978) was a German politician of the Christian Democratic Union (CDU) and former member of the German Bundestag.

Life 
He was elected to the German Bundestag for the first time in 1949 and was represented in it until 1961, entering parliament in all ballots via his party's Lower Saxony state list. Mensing was a member of the Committee for Food, Agriculture and Forestry.

Literature

References

1895 births
1978 deaths
Members of the Bundestag for Lower Saxony
Members of the Bundestag 1957–1961
Members of the Bundestag 1953–1957
Members of the Bundestag 1949–1953
Members of the Bundestag for the Christian Democratic Union of Germany